Brandwag is a suburb of the city of Bloemfontein in South Africa. The primary school is named Brandwag Primary.

References

Suburbs of Bloemfontein